William McMillan (1876 – February 1958) was a Scottish professional footballer who made 178 appearances in the Football League playing for Lincoln City between 1898 and 1906. He played as a right back or centre half. He also played non-league football for clubs including Newark Town, Castleford Town and Boston Town.

References

1876 births
1958 deaths
Scottish footballers
Association football defenders
Lincoln City F.C. players
Newark Town F.C. players
Castleford Town F.C. players
Boston Town F.C. (1920s) players
English Football League players
Date of birth missing
Place of birth missing
Place of death missing